The Muzz MacPherson Award is a trophy that is presented to the Manitoba Junior Hockey League coach judged to have contributed the most to his team’s success.  The trophy is named after former  coach Murray MacPherson, who led the Portage Terriers to the 1973 Centennial Cup national championship.

MJHL Coaches of the Year

References

External links
Manitoba Junior Hockey League
Hockey Hall of Fame
Winnipeg Free Press Archives
Brandon Sun Archives

Manitoba Junior Hockey League trophies and awards